Kakhnovka is a rural locality (a selo) in Dmitriyevsky Selsoviet, Chishminsky District, Bashkortostan, Russia. The population was 43 as of 2010. There are 2 streets.

Geography 
Kakhnovka is located 24 km north of Chishmy (the district's administrative centre) by road. Dmitriyevka is the nearest rural locality.

References 

Rural localities in Chishminsky District